The 2012–13 Women's LEN Trophy will be the fourteenth edition of LEN's second-tier competition for women's water polo clubs. It will be contested by thirteen teams from eight countries. The group stage was played between 22 – 25 November 2012.

Group stage

Group Α

Group Β

Quarter-finals

Semifinals

Final

References

Women's LEN Trophy seasons
Women, Trophy
2012 in water polo
2013 in water polo
LEN
LEN